SS-42, SS 42 or SS42 may refer to:

 BAP Abtao (SS-42), a submarine of the Peruvian Navy  
SS 42 the road over both the Mendelpass and the Tonale Pass in Italy
 USS L-3 (SS-42), a submarine of the United States Navy which saw service during World War I

See also 

 USS S-42 (SS-153), a submarine of the United States Navy which saw service during World War I